Khejri Hanuman Temple situated near Government college Suratgarh  in Ganganagar district in the Indian state of Rajasthan . It is one of the tourist attraction of the city. Every Tuesday and Saturday are busy days of week. On Hanuman Jayanti community kitchen is organised. Hanuman Khejri Temple also known for selfie zone due to its location on sand dunes. Public spend some time on nearby sand dunes.

References

Temples in Rajasthan
Sri Ganganagar district